Veer Savarkar Airport  is a domestic airport located  south of Port Blair and is the main airport of the Andaman and Nicobar Islands of India. Originally known as "Port Blair Airport", it was renamed in 2002 after Vinayak Damodar Savarkar, who had been detained in the Cellular Jail in the city for 11 years. It operates as a civil enclave, sharing airside facilities with INS Utkrosh of the Indian Navy.

Overview
Except for the civilian terminal operated by the Airports Authority of India, all other air traffic operations over Port Blair are undertaken by the Indian Navy.

Terminal
The passenger terminal has a capacity of 400 passengers. It covers an area of 6,100 square metres. There is only one terminal, with two gates and no aerobridges. Buses are used to provide transportation from the terminal to the aircraft parked on the apron.

New terminal

Due to increasing traffic, a new 40,837 sq.m. passenger terminal at a cost of ₹ 707 crore is under construction since 2019. It will have three floors–one for arrivals, second for departures and third for waiting. Inside the terminal, there will be 28 check-in counters and four conveyor belts. Initially, it was planned that it will have three aerobridges, but recently, it has increased to four. It will be able to handle 1,200 passengers (600 domestic and 600 international) at peak hours, and will be able to serve 5 million passengers per annum.

As of 2022, the new terminal is under construction, and it is about 83% completed. It was s expected to be completed by October 2022, but now it is confirmed to be opened by the first half of 2023.

Airlines and destinations

Statistics

References

External links
7
 Vir Savarkar Airport (official Airports Authority of India web site)

Port Blair
Airports in the Andaman and Nicobar Islands
International airports in India
Memorials to Vinayak Damodar Savarkar
Airports with year of establishment missing